Eden is the third studio album by Japanese rock band Luna Sea, released on April 21, 1993. It reached number five on the Oricon Albums Chart, and charted for 19 weeks. In 2000, it was certified Platinum by the RIAJ for sales over 400,000.

Overview 
To support the album Luna Sea embarked on the fourteen date Search For My Eden tour, followed by its four date encore tour which ended with them headlining the Nippon Budokan.

The album versions of "Believe" and "In My Dream (With Shiver)" are slightly different than the singles' recording. "Believe" was originally called "AI", and is a rewritten version of the earlier song "Conclusion". The song "Providence" was originally titled "Waltz". "Lastly" was re-recorded from their 1990 demo of the same name. In 2000, the band re-recorded "Believe", which was their first single, for the compilation album Period -the Best Selection-.

Eden was remastered and re-released by Universal Music Group on December 5, 2007, it came with a DVD of the promotional videos for "Believe" and "In My Dream (With Shiver)". This version reached number 191 on the Oricon chart.

"In My Dream (With Shiver)" was covered by LM.C for the 2007 Luna Sea Memorial Cover Album -Re:birth-.

Luna Sea's second Lunatic X'Mas 2018 -Introduction to the 30th Anniversary- concert at Saitama Super Arena on December 23, 2018 was subtitled Search for My Eden after the album's 1993 tour. There they performed some songs that had not been played since the original tour.

Eden and the band's seven other major label studio albums, up to Luv, were released on vinyl record for the first time on May 29, 2019.

Track listing

References 

Luna Sea albums
1993 albums